Dumitru Bogdan (born 4 March 1989, Chișinău, Moldavian SSR) is a Moldavian football defender who plays for FC Academia Chișinău.

Club statistics
Total matches played in Moldavian First League: 70 matches - 5 goals

References

External links

Profile at Divizia Nationala

1989 births
Footballers from Chișinău
Moldovan footballers
Living people
Association football defenders
FC Iskra-Stal players
FC Sfîntul Gheorghe players
FC Academia Chișinău players
FC Taraz players
FC Kaisar players
FC Tobol players